Phantasies is the name of a series of animated cartoons produced by the Screen Gems studio for Columbia Pictures from 1939 to 1946. The series, featuring characters such as Willoughby Wren and Superkatt, is notable as being the last theatrical animated series produced in black-and-white by a major studio. To cut costs, Columbia did not move the Phantasies out of black-and-white until the end of 1946, when it went to all-Cinecolor production.

Filmography

See also
Color Rhapsodies

References

External links
Internet Movie Database

Columbia cartoons series and characters
Film series introduced in 1939
American animation anthology series
American animated short films
Screen Gems film series